There are four seasons of The Story Makers. These are the episodes.

Series 1 (2002)

Series 2 (2002)

Series 3 (2002-03)

Series 4 (2004)

References

Story Makers